ŠTK 1914 Šamorín is a Slovak football team, based in the town of Šamorín. The club was founded in 1914. In the season 2009/2010, they were promoted to Slovak Third League. In season 2015/16 the club was promoted to the Slovak Second League.

History 
The club was founded on 1 June 1914 (original name in hungarian Somorjai Testgyakorlók Köre). Their first stadium (in Pomlé, Šamorín) was opened in 1930. Their first game in the stadium, against FSV Vienna was a sweet 2–0 victory in front of 1,500 spectators. ŠTK proudly announced that there will be places for more kids to play (Mladsi, Starsi ziaci and Dorast). This has brought a big success, because according to the 2010 statistics, almost 400 kids play football there. Analysing all of this, the Samorin players and members should all be proud of their president, Norbert Csutora. 
In 2010 December Csutora made an agreement to exchange steel for the seats of the old HC Slovan Bratislava ground (Because a new stadium was getting built, for the 2011 IIHF World Championship that was held in Slovakia).
He got over 500 seats and gave the fans with high quality seating places, which replaced the old benches there.

In 2015, STK Samorin signed a partnership with one of the biggest Brazilian teams, Fluminense FC. In the same season, the club was promoted to Slovakia's second division and, in 2016–2017 season, is currently seeking promotion to Fortuna Liga, the Slovak top flight.

Affiliated club
The following club is affiliated with FC ŠTK 1914 Šamorín:
  Fluminense FC (2015–2019)
  DAC 1904 Dunajská Streda (2019–)

Current squad 
Updated 8 August, 2022

For recent transfers, see List of Slovak football transfers winter 2022–23.

Current technical staff 

 Last updated: 25 December 2018

Notable players
Had international caps for their respective countries. Players whose name is listed in bold represented their countries while playing for Šamorín.
Past (and present) players who are the subjects of Wikipedia articles can be found here.

 Ladislav Almási
 Balázs Borbély
 Csaba Horváth
 Sainey Njie

Notable coaches 

 Vladimír Koník (2011-12)
 Libor Fašiang (2013)
 Miroslav Hýll (2014)
 Jozef Kontír (Apr 2015 - Nov 2015)
 Mike Keeney (Jan 2016 – Jan 2017)
 Mika Lönnström (Jan 2017 – Mar 2018)
 Gustavo Leal (Mar 2018 – Dec 2018)
 Sanjin Alagić (Dec 2018 – June 2019)
 Branislav Sokoli (June 2019 – Oct 2019)
  (Oct 2019–Dec 2020)
 Michal Kuruc (Feb 2021-Dec 2022)
 Juraj Ančic (Jan 2023-)

References

External links 
Official club website 
 

 
Football clubs in Slovakia
Association football clubs established in 1914
1914 establishments in Slovakia